Shahab Khel is a town and union council of Lakki Marwat District in Khyber Pakhtunkhwa province of Pakistan. It is located at 32°43'58N 71°1'4E and has an altitude of 328 metres (1079 feet).

References

Union councils of Lakki Marwat District
Populated places in Lakki Marwat District